NGC 3886 is a lenticular galaxy located about 280 million light-years away in the constellation Leo. It was discovered by astronomer Heinrich d'Arrest on May 9, 1864. The galaxy is a member of the Leo Cluster.

See also
 List of NGC objects (3001–4000)

References

External links

3886
36756
Leo (constellation)
Leo Cluster
Astronomical objects discovered in 1864
Lenticular galaxies
6760